The Seven Robbers were martyrs on the island of Corcyra (Corfu) in the 2nd century AD. Their names were Saturninus, Insischolus (Jakischolus), Faustianus, Januarius, Marsalius, Euphrasius, and Mammius.

Life
The Greek menologia (calendars of the saints) inform us that Sts. Jason and Sosipater, who had been instructed in Christianity by the Apostles or by Jesus himself, came to the island of Corcyra to preach Christianity. After making numerous conversions they were cast into a dungeon where the above-named seven robbers were imprisoned. They succeeded in converting the robbers who were then taken outside the city and martyred by being cast into cauldrons that were filled with seething oil and pitch.

Commemoration
Some Greek menologies mention them on April 27, others, on April 29. In the Roman martyrology, The Seven Robbers are commemorated on April 20.

References

Attribution
 That entry was written by Michael Ott.

2nd-century births
2nd-century deaths
Groups of Christian martyrs of the Roman era
Greek robbers
2nd-century Christian martyrs
Ancient Corcyrans
Saints from Roman Greece
Septets
Groups of Christian martyrs of the Early Modern era